Peter Tom  is an American attorney who served as an associate justice of the Appellate Division of the Supreme Court, First Judicial Department from 1994 to 2019.

Education 
Tom received his bachelor's degree from the City College of New York, and in 1975, graduated Brooklyn Law School.

Career 
In 1976, he worked as a law clerk for the New York City Civil Court, working on both criminal and civil assignments. He was appointed as a judge on the housing court from 1985 to 1988 and a civil court from 1988 to 1990. He was a New York Supreme Court justice, from 1990 to 1994. He was designated a justice for the Appellate Division, First Judicial Department by Governor Mario Cuomo in 1994 and served as acting presiding justice in 2007, 2009, and 2016. He was the first Asian American elected to the New York State Supreme Court from New York County and the first Asian American to the Appellate Division of the Supreme Court.

See also
List of Asian American jurists
List of first minority male lawyers and judges in New York

References

Living people
New York (state) lawyers
Lawyers from New York City
Year of birth missing (living people)
Brooklyn Law School alumni